The Olympus OM-D E-M5 Mark II is a digital interchangeable-lens camera announced in February 2015. It features a new 40-megapixel high-resolution mode that uses sensor shift to generate overlapping 16-megapixel images to then compute a 40-megapixel composite. It is the successor of the Olympus OM-D E-M5. Compared to that earlier model from 2012 and flagship OM-D E-M1 released in 2013, both of which are claimed to have 4 f-stops of shake compensation when shooting handheld, Olympus claims the OM-D E-M5 II can compensate 5 f-stops.

New significant features
 Improved five-axis stabilization which can compensate shaking in handheld shot by 5 stops
 FullHD video recording at 24p, 25p, 30p, 50p, and 60p with up to 77-Mbit/s bitrates
 can take 64MP RAW (40MP JPEG) files by moving the sensor between each shot and merging eight single exposures taken over the course of 1 second into one image
 dust-and-splash-proof magnesium-alloy body

References

External links

DPReview news item

OM-D E-M5 Mark II
Cameras introduced in 2015